Yelling to the Sky is a 2011 American drama film written and directed by Victoria Mahoney and starring Zoë Kravitz. The film premiered In Competition at the 61st Berlin International Film Festival, where it competed for the Golden Bear.

Plot
The film starts out with quiet, studious, high schooler, Sweetness O'Hara riding her bike with a friend down the street, when neighborhood bully Latonya, her boyfriend, and friends begins picking on her. The boyfriend threatens to take her bike, unless she can beat him in a race to a tree down the street. Sweetness agrees, taking off running. The bully comes up behind her and pushes her to the ground, proceeding to kick her. Sweetness' older, pregnant sister, Ola, comes to her rescue, beating up the bully.

The girls return home to their emotionally unstable mother, Lorene, and caring, but violent father, Gordon. After an altercation between the parents, Lorene takes off, telling Sweetness she would return. Gordon takes off as well, with Sweetness saying she wished he stayed wherever it was he went.

A few days later, as Ola is helping Sweetness with her homework and ironing, Gordon returns. He hits Ola after her choice to wear a jacket inside the house. Ola then packs up and moves in with her probation-serving, abusive boyfriend and baby's father, leaving Sweetness with just her father. Months go by and Ola returns with a baby girl named Esther. Not too long after, Lorene returns as well, in an absent state of mind.

At school, her principal, Mr. Coleman, unknowingly protects Sweetness from getting beat up by Latonya and her friends, Fatima and Jojo, by asking about her sister and asking how she was doing. The girls deliver a letter written to their father, saying his brother has passed in his sleep. After their father embarrasses them in front of his friends, Sweetness announces that she hates their father to her sister as they walk home. Back at home, with Gordon absent, Ola chases after Lorene, who has absent-mindedly walked out of the house. Sweetness gets frustrated at the way their lives are going and decides to take action.

The next morning, Sweetness and her father get into a fight due to her wearing makeup to school. She defends herself, talking back and throwing a bottle of glue at him, telling him that was the last time he would ever hit her. She starts selling drugs, with the help of a local drug dealer and friend, Roland, who is reluctant. She persuades him by telling him it is not for extra spending, but to help her family out. He agrees.

She begins to hang out with Fatima and Jojo, after they buy drugs off her. She fights Latonya at school, which ends up in getting Sweetness suspended. She sees Latonya at school later on, carrying books and going to class, symbolizing how the roles have reversed between the girls since the start of the film.

During a drug deal, Sweetness tags along with Roland, who tells her to stay put. She walks into the hotel room, against Roland's advice, and is groped by one of the drug dealers. The two manage to escape the failed drug deal, and almost get arrested in the process. When Roland drops Sweetness off, she kisses him, but he refuses her advances, but continues kissing her despite her age.

A few days later, while the girls and Roland are cutting school and playing handball, the two guys from the failed drug deal drive by and shoot Roland, who dies instantly. Sweetness blames herself for the shooting, realizing that if she hadn't walked into the hotel room, he would still be alive. She angrily destroys her own and Ola's shared bedroom, and takes off with Ola's car to a party. On her way home, while drunk and high on coke and weed (and after losing her virginity), Sweetness totals the car, promising to pay her sister back every penny.

After helping her father put stitches on a cut on his head one night, her father starts to become less violent towards his family. He sees Sweetness drinking with her friends on the street one day, but doesn't get angry at her when she returns home that night. He follows her to school and waits for her afterwards, following her back home. She expresses her frustration with him, demanding to know what he wants. He tells her that he is worried about her and that he is here for her now, all with her replying "too late now".

Realizing her future if she stays in her neighborhood, she starts to turn things around. First, by applying for college, apologizing to Latonya (who doesn't accept it), and opting to stay in and do dishes instead of going out with her friends.

The film ends with her and her father halfway between her high school and house, with him saying that he is going to walk with her the next day. She offers meeting him halfway (because of his hip), but he refuses. She starts to cry and the two embrace, slowly fading out to the credits.

Cast

 Zoë Kravitz as Sweetness O'Hara
 Jason Clarke as Gordon O'Hara
 Antonique Smith as Ola O'Hara
 Tariq "Black Thought" Trotter as Roland
 Shareeka Epps as Fatima Harris
 Tim Blake Nelson as Coleman
 Gabourey Sidibe as Latonya Williams
 Yolonda Ross as Lorene O'Hara
 Adam Tomei as Cal
 Billy Kay as Dobbs
 Gio Perez as Shorty
 Peter Anthony Tambakis as Drew
 E. J. Bonilla as Rob
 Sonequa Martin as Jojo Parker
 Hassan Manning as Bohanen
 Marc John Jefferies as Lil' Man

Reception
The US industry trade paper, Variety, said of the film, "Yelling to the Sky" boasts a strong directorial voice. [Victoria] Mahoney was clearly driven by a genuine creative gift, and escaped such restraints to unleash this affecting cri du coeur." Despite seeing promise in her talent, the critic found the film overall unsatisfactory, stating it was “strong on texture but taxingly light on narrative.”

Filmmaker named Mahoney one of the 2010 "25 New Faces of Independent Film", saying of the film, "A powerful, emotionally nuanced debut. Mahoney, who has drawn fine performances from her actors, has a sophisticated and empathetic understanding of the characters they play."

References

External links
 
 
 
 Official Facebook

2011 films
2011 drama films
2010s teen drama films
2011 independent films
2010s gang films
2011 directorial debut films
2010s coming-of-age drama films
American coming-of-age drama films
American teen drama films
American gang films
American independent films
2010s English-language films
African-American drama films
Films about domestic violence
Films about drugs
Films about dysfunctional families
Films set in New York City
Films shot in New York City
Films about interracial romance
2010s American films